was a Japanese narrator and voice actor from Tokyo, Japan. He was a Waseda University graduate.

Voice roles

Anime
The Adventures of Tom Sawyer (role unspecified)
Doraemon (1973 anime) (Nobisuke Nobi)
GeGeGe no Kitaro 1985 (Dracula)
Gekisou Rubenkaiser (narrator)
Genshi Shōnen Ryuu (Taka)
Hello! Sandybell (Kankan)
Himitsu no Akko-chan (Akko's father)
Kouya no Shōnen Isamu (Ned Wingate)
Lady Oscar (Count Mercy)
Marine Boy (role unspecified)
Meiken Jolie (role unspecified)
Ōgon Bat (Dr. Yamatone)
Sazae-san (Norisuke Namino)
Seigi wo Aisuru Mono Gekko Kamen (role unspecified)
Space Battleship Yamato (Genits, politician)
Space Oz no Bouken (Dr. Oz, Moji's father)
Wakakusa no Charlotte (Andre)
Yattodetaman (role unspecified)
Yūsha Raidīn (Ichiro Hibiki)

OVAs
Bubblegum Crash (plant chief)
Legend of the Galactic Heroes (Schtaaden)
Mashin Eiyuden Wataru: Warinaki Toki no Monogatari (old man)
Sohryuden: Legend of the Dragon Kings (Forester)

Films
Farewell Space Battleship Yamato (Goenitz, politician)
GeGeGe no Kitaro: The Great Yōkai War (role unspecified)
Golgo 13: The Professional (E. Young)
Lupin III: Mystery of Mamo (scientist)
Royal Space Force: The Wings of Honneamise (airman)

Tokusatsu
Space Amoeba (Space Amoeba)
Kamen Rider (Arigabari, Sea-Dragon)
Inazuman (narrator)
Fireman (narrator)
Bouken Rockbat (narrator, Black Cloud Warujan)
Skyrider (Komoljin, Haejigokujin, Elder Musasabader, Torikabuton)
Kamen Rider Super-1 (Kamagirigan, Lonely Wolf Red Danger)
Chodenshi Bioman (narrator)

Dubbing
The Blue Lagoon (1983 TBS edition) (Arthur Lestrange (William Daniels))
Goldfinger (1978 NTV edition) (Felix Leiter (Cec Linder))
Indiana Jones and the Last Crusade (Marcus Brody (Denholm Elliott))

References

External links
 

1930 births
2007 deaths
Japanese male voice actors
Male voice actors from Tokyo